Archaeocindis is a genus of ground beetles in the family Carabidae. There are at least two described species in Archaeocindis.

Species
These two species belong to the genus Archaeocindis:
 Archaeocindis hormozensis Azadbakhsh, 2020
 Archaeocindis johnbeckeri (Bänninger, 1927)

References

Nebriinae
Monotypic Carabidae genera